is a Japanese manga series written by Kazuma Kamachi and illustrated by Arata Yamaji. It is a spin-off of A Certain Magical Index series, which focuses on Academy City's most powerful Level 5 esper named Accelerator. The manga was serialized by ASCII Media Works through their monthly magazine Dengeki Daioh from December 2013 to July 2020 and published in English by Seven Seas Entertainment. Kamachi and Teto Tachitsu wrote and illustrated its manga spin-off titled A Certain Idol Accelerator-sama, which was published from October 2015 to November 2018. An anime television series adaptation by J.C.Staff aired from July 12 to September 27, 2019.

Plot

After protecting Last Order at the cost of much of his power, Accelerator now finds himself dragged into a new conflict in the form of a sinister organization called Disciplinary Action which plots to use Last Order for a dangerous mission. Now that they have set their plan into motion and are in pursuit of the young girl, it is up to the world's most powerful esper and his newfound companion, Esther Rosenthal, to protect Last Order and defend Academy City in the process.

Media

Manga
The October 2013 issue of Dengeki Daioh magazine announced a manga spin-off of A Certain Magical Index series to be written by Kazuma Kamachi and illustrated by Arata Yamaji and Kiyotaka Haimura, which began serialization in the magazine's February 2014 issue on December 27, 2013. On March 25, 2015, Seven Seas Entertainment announced the English publication of A Certain Scientific Accelerator in North America. The manga concluded in the September issue of Dengeki Daioh on July 27, 2020.

Spin-off
A four-panel comedy manga spin-off of the series written by Kamachi and illustrated by Teto Tachitsu, titled , began serialization in Dengeki Daioh from October 27, 2015 to November 27, 2018. It focuses on Accelerator's career as an idol, along with other Level 5 espers.

Anime

On October 7, 2018, an anime television adaptation of A Certain Scientific Accelerator was announced. The series is animated by J.C.Staff and directed by Nobuharu Kamanaka, with Kenji Sugihara handling series composition and Yohei Yaegashi designing the characters. Maiko Iuchi, the composer of A Certain Magical Index and A Certain Scientific Railgun, was confirmed in March 2019 to be composing the series. The Sixth Lie and sajou no hana performed the opening and ending theme music titled "Shadow is the Light" and "Parole", respectively. Twelve episodes were aired in Japan on AT-X, Tokyo MX, BS11, and MBS from July 12 to September 27, 2019. The first Blu-ray and DVD volumes of the series were published on October 30, 2019, followed by the second and final volumes on December 25, and February 28, 2020.

On July 12, 2019, Crunchyroll began streaming A Certain Scientific Accelerator outside of Asia, while Muse Communication began distributing it on their Muse Asia YouTube channel. Funimation began streaming the series in the United States, Canada, the United Kingdom, Ireland, Australia, and New Zealand on July 26, 2019, and Netflix released the full season in India on September 1, 2020. The series was released on Hulu in Japan on March 24, 2022.

Episode list

Reception

Sales
The first volume of A Certain Scientific Accelerator sold 39,039 copies in the first week of its release, ranking 27th behind Kuroko's Basketball, and 54,093 copies in the second week, coming in twelfth.

Critical response
Evan Minto of Otaku USA found A Certain Scientific Accelerator lacking an "establishing exposition" and noted its "confusing starting point" but commended Yamaji's "comfortable" handling of action scenes.

Theron Martin of Anime News Network rated the first episode of the series' anime adaptation 4 out of 5 stars, describing the overall production "at least... impressive" despite his concerns with Kamanaka and Sugihara due to their previous works and the show a "sharp enough addition to the franchise that... should not disappoint any established fan of the franchise".

Notes

References

External links
  at Dengeki Daioh 
  
 
 
 

2019 anime television series debuts
ASCII Media Works manga
A Certain Magical Index
A Certain Magical Index episode lists
Crunchyroll anime
Dengeki Daioh
Funimation
J.C.Staff
Kadokawa Dwango franchises
Muse Communication
NBCUniversal Entertainment Japan
Seven Seas Entertainment titles
Shōnen manga
Works published under a pseudonym
Yonkoma